Kramgoa låtar 2000 is a studio album by Vikingarna, released on 21 August 2000.

Track listing
Ett liv i kärlek
Livet går ej i repris
Love Letters in the Sand
Du är det bästa som har hänt
Aldrig nånsin ska jag glömma dej
Jag vet
Ett steg till
Det kan aldrig bli vi två
Min bästa tid har jag kvar
Vi två
Du har fått mej tro på kärleken
Kom stanna kvar
It's Now or Never
En enda blick

Charts

References 

2000 albums
Vikingarna (band) albums